Paul Goodwin Garnes is an American film and television producer. He is best known for his work on the 2014 film Selma, which is nominated for the 2015 Academy Award for Best Picture and Best Original Song and won a 2015 Golden Globe Award for Best Original Song.

In 2012, his film Middle of Nowhere, directed by Ava DuVernay, won the 2013 Independent Spirit John Cassavetes Award.

Early life
Garnes was born in Pittsburgh, Pennsylvania, and soon after adopted by Marjorie Goodwin Garnes and Paul Garnes. Garnes grew up in Harvey, Illinois

Garnes attended Thornton Township High School in Harvey, Illinois, where he graduated in 1989. He is a 1994 graduate of Chicago's Columbia College

He is the grandson of the late Bishop Bennie E. Goodwin, former bishop of the Fifth Jurisdiction Of Illinois Churches of God in Christ and founder of Portland Street Church of God in Christ in Chicago Heights, Illinois.

Career 
Paul Garnes has served as producer, line producer and/or production manager on films and television series for Disney, DreamWorks, HBO, ABC, NBC, BET, Sony/Screen Gems, Magnolia Pictures, and Paramount Pictures.
 
A graduate of Chicago's Columbia College, Garnes has worked as Vice President of Operations and Production for Academy Award winner Jamie Foxx's Foxx/King Productions and Head of Production for Simmons-Lathan Media Group.
 
In 2006, Garnes was recruited by Tyler Perry and Reuben Cannon to join the Tyler Perry Company where he served as Vice President and Executive in Charge of Production until 2009, overseeing the creation of its multimillion-dollar studio and backlot. In addition to daily operations, Garnes supervised over 250 episodes of broadcast television while at the studio.
 
In 2011, he produced filmmaker Ava DuVernay's award-winning independent feature, Middle of Nowhere, which won Best Director honors at the 2012 Sundance Film Festival and the Independent Spirit Awards' John Cassavetes Award.

In 2014, Paul was executive producer of the film Selma, a biopic directed by Ava DuVernay and distributed by Paramount Pictures, which chronicles a series of the three Selma marches led by Dr. Martin Luther King Jr. supporting the Voting Rights Act of 1965. Selma is nominated for the 2015 Academy Award for Best Picture and Best Original Song, and won a 2015 Golden Globe for Best Original Song.

In an interview from January 2015, he stated, “It’s not about ‘reclaiming the narrative,’ necessarily, but offering a point of view about the civil rights movement that many people haven’t seen before. It was told from the perspective of the marcher standing on the bridge that day when there wasn’t government support during the actions that occurred on Bloody Sunday, about what it must have been like for these organizers to go into a pretty hostile environment using the skill set of nonviolence to push an agenda that maybe the country wasn’t ready for.”

In addition, Garnes continued his work as producer on the final season of BET's hit series The Game.

Filmography 
 Caste (TBA) - Producer
 Selma (2014) - Executive Producer, Unit Production Manager 
 Middle of Nowhere (2012) - Producer 
 Woman Thou Art Loosed (2004) - Line Producer, Production Supervisor 
 You Got Served (2004) - Production Supervisor 
 Playas Ball (2003) - Unit Production Manager 
 Biker Boyz (2003) - Unit Production Manager 
 Get Up Stand Up Comedy (2001) (Video) - Editor, Line Producer
 Dancing in September (2000) - Associate Producer, Production Supervisor
 Woo (1998) - Art Department Coordinator (second unit)
 The Players Club (1998) - Assistant Accountant 
 Shock Asylum (1997) (Short) - Line Producer

Television 

 Being Mary Jane (2013-2015) - Line Producer 
 The Game (2012-2015) - Line Producer 
 Diggy Simmons MOW (TV Movie) (2013) - Line Producer 
 House of Payne (2006-2011) - Unit Production Manager 
 Partners (2011) - Production Supervisor 
 Russell Simmons Presents: Hip Hop Justice (2004) - Supervising Producer 
 An Evening with Russell Simmons (TV Movie) (2004) - Editor 
 Roots: Celebrating 25 Years (TV Movie) (2002) - Co-Producer 
 My Wife and Kids (2001) - Production Coordinator 
 Smart Guy (1998-1999) - Production Coordinator

Awards and nominations

References

American film producers
Living people
Year of birth missing (living people)